Dellis Cay is a  private island located in the Turks and Caicos Islands
archipelago. 

This island sits south of Parrot Cay and north of Pine Cay and can be easily noted in the chain of Caicos Islands. 
Dellis Cay is located a few miles from Providenciales and is accessible by a 20-minute boat ride. The island got its name from the Dellis family who lived on the island and earned their living sponge farming in the 1950s. In addition to being known for sponge farming and conching, Dellis Cay is also known for its large collection of island shells that can be found along its shoreline. 
A real estate project "The Residences at Mandarin Oriental Dellis Cay" was expected to open in the middle of 2010, but the project went bankrupt in early 2010 and construction was halted. In early 2011, the project was cancelled due to financial problems.

References

External links
“Luxurious in Its Simplicity”- Times of the Islands. Retrieved 30 January 2009.
Dellis Cay Website.
Dellis Cay at TCI Mall

Islands of the Turks and Caicos Islands
Private islands of the Caribbean